The Special Areas (Development and Improvement) Act was an Act of Parliament which gave aid to the areas of Britain which had the highest unemployment rates in the 1930s. Areas which benefited included South Wales, Tyneside, Cumberland and southern Scotland; but not Lancashire. There were two unpaid commissioners, one for Scotland, one for England and Wales, given responsibility to spend £2 million via the local authorities concerned. A further £3 million was added in 1936, and £3.5 million was included in the estimates for 1937. "The powers of the commissioners included a wide range of activities on general economic development and on social improvement in the Special Areas, but they were expressly precluded by Parliament from giving assistance to private enterprise carried on for gain". The subject of the Special Areas was a main election issue at the 1935 General Election.  The Special Areas (Amendment) Act 1937 extended the Act.

References 

United Kingdom Acts of Parliament 1934